Effiakuma is a residential town in the Western region of Ghana. It is about 10 kilometres from Takoradi the regional capital. It was built in the early 1960s by the then president of the country Kwame Nkrumah. There are about three general plans for the buildings in the town. The houses were built by the State Housing Cooperation. Effiakuma is the forty-seventh most populous in Ghana, in terms of population, with a population of 35,094 people. On the outskirts of the town is the Effiakuma Zongo.

In March 2011 many Mossi Muslims who fled the conflict in Ivory Coast took refuge in the town.

Boundary
The town is bounded to the west and North by Takoradi, to the east by Effia, to the south by Anaji.

References

Populated places in the Western Region (Ghana)